Trinity Church of England School is a coeducational Church of England all-through school based over two sites in the London Borough of Lewisham, England.

Trinity is a voluntary aided school administered by the Anglican Diocese of Southwark and Lewisham London Borough Council. The Executive Headteacher of the school is Mr David Lucas.

The secondary phase of the school is located on Taunton Road in a building first opened in January 2011. The primary phase of the school is located on Ennersdale Road, and first opened to pupils in September 2013. The primary phase buildings were used between 2007 and 2011 as the temporary home for the secondary phase of the school while a new £16 Million pound building was built.

References

External links
Trinity Church of England School official website

Secondary schools in the London Borough of Lewisham
Church of England secondary schools in the Diocese of Southwark
Primary schools in the London Borough of Lewisham
Church of England primary schools in the Diocese of Southwark
Voluntary aided schools in London